Natalie Anderson Scott (September 7, 1906February 15, 1983), sometimes Natalie B. Sokoloff, was a Russian Empire-born American writer.

Natalie Anderson Scott was born on September 7, 1906, in Ekaterinoslav (now called Dnipro), to Nadjeshda (Mochugovskai) and Boris Kamyshansky Sokoloff. She went to school in England before coming to the United States in 1914 or 1915; her family settled permanently in the US in 1922. She began publishing short stories in 1929 and her first novel, So Brief the Years, came out in 1935.

Scott died on February 15, 1983, in Larchmont, New York.

Books 
 So Brief the Years (1935)
 The Sisters Livingston (1946)
 The Story of Mrs. Murphy (1947)
 The Husband (1948)
 Romance (1951)
 The Little Stockade (1954)
 Salvation Johnny (1958)
 The Golden Trollop (1961)

References 

1906 births
1983 deaths
20th-century American writers
20th-century American women writers
People from Dnipro
Emigrants from the Russian Empire to the United States